The Cushing Citizen is a newspaper founded in 1895 as the community newspaper of local town Cushing, Oklahoma. Through the years the newspaper has had numerous owners including O.H. and Hattie Mae Lauchenmeyer. In the past the paper has been issued weekly and then daily.  It is currently published once weekly by J.D. and Marylee Meisner, who purchased the Citizen in February of 2020 from David and Myra Reid who moved to Cushing in 1992 when they purchased the Cushing Daily Citizen from Francis Stipe. The Reids sold the newspaper to CNHI in 1997 and purchased the paper again from CNHI in October 2007. The paper became a weekly in print in January, 2018 and an online "Weekender" edition was added. The Reids sold the Citizen in February, 2020, to Cimarron Valley Communications, LLC, owned by J. D. and MaryLee Meisner.

External links
 Cushing Citizen

References 

Newspapers published in Oklahoma
Payne County, Oklahoma